David Dastmalchian (born July 21, 1975) is an American film and stage actor. He has had supporting roles in a number of superhero franchises; he portrayed Thomas Schiff in The Dark Knight (2008), Kurt and Veb in the Marvel Cinematic Universe, Abra Kadabra in The CW's The Flash, and Polka-Dot Man in The Suicide Squad (2021). He has also appeared in three of Denis Villeneuve's films: Prisoners (2013), Blade Runner 2049 (2017), and Dune (2021). Dastmalchian wrote and starred in the semi-autobiographical film Animals (2014).

Early life and career 
David Dastmalchian was born on July 21, 1975, in Allentown, Pennsylvania, to Priscilla (née Doran; 1941–2020) and Hossein Dastmalchian (1937–2021), an Iranian-American engineer who worked at engineering firm Black & Veatch. He has two sisters and a brother. His parents divorced, which he described as "tumultuous", and both remarried. He was raised in Overland Park, Kansas, where he attended Shawnee Mission South High School, becoming part of the drama club. He described growing up in the Kansas City metropolitan area as "very traditional in one sense, and a conservative community that also had a rad, fringe, artistic, progressive tribe of people who were finding connectivity through the arts and the culture of KC and the surrounding suburbs."

In his childhood, Dastmalchian developed vitiligo, for which he suffered ridicule from his peers. Consequently, he experienced depression throughout his childhood. Growing up, he enjoyed football, theater, and comics. He studied at The Theatre School at DePaul University and graduated in 1999. Prior to beginning his career as an actor, he dealt with a heroin addiction for five years. He wrote about his experiences in his screenplay, Animals, and continues to advocate for mental health and substance abuse treatment programs. Shortly after becoming sober, he worked at a seafood restaurant in Kansas City. He was also briefly a fisherman in Alaska.

Career 
Dastmalchian began his professional career in the mid-2000s in Chicago, working on stage and in commercials. He has received acclaim for lead roles in Tennessee Williams's The Glass Menagerie and Sam Shepard's Buried Child at Chicago's Shattered Globe Theatre. He was involved with a number of Chicago theater companies and was an artistic associate at Caffeine Theatre.

His feature film debut came in the late 2000s, as the Joker's deranged henchman, Thomas Schiff, in Christopher Nolan's The Dark Knight. His portrayal of Bob Taylor in Denis Villeneuve's Prisoners received strong reviews. Richard Corliss of Time called Dastmalchian's performance "excellent – chatty, modest with some subtle telltale psychopathy" and The Guardians Paul MacInnes likened his introduction as a new suspect to Kevin Spacey's entrance in Seven.

In March 2014, Dastmalchian was awarded the Special Jury Prize for Courage in Storytelling at the South by Southwest Film Festival. He wrote and starred in the feature film Animals, directed by Collin Schiffli. Ashley Moreno of The Austin Chronicle credits Dastmalchian's screenplay with "present[ing] an authenticity often lacking in films about drug abuse." Film Threats Brian Tallerico similarly sings the praises of Dastmalchian's breakout performance, noting his ability to "capture that sense of self-loathing that comes through in the body language of an addict without overselling it."

Other feature film appearances include starring roles in the psychological thriller The Employer, the indie grindhouse hit Sushi Girl, the drama Cass (winner, San Diego Black Film Festival), Girls Will Be Girls 2012 (a sequel to the 2003 cult hit Girls Will Be Girls), Saving Lincoln, Virgin Alexander, Ant-Man, and Michel Franco's Chronic.

He has also appeared on television: as Simon on the Fox sci-fi series Almost Human, in the episode "Simon Says"; as a chess expert and murder suspect on the CBS forensics procedural drama series CSI: Crime Scene Investigation; and as Oz Turner on the BBC drama series Intruders. Other television appearances include the FX sitcom The League, the Showtime crime drama series Ray Donovan, and NBC's medical drama ER.

Dastmalchian portrayed DC Comics villain Abra Kadabra in seasons 3 and 7 of The Flash.

In 2017 he reunited with Denis Villeneuve when he appeared in Blade Runner 2049. The following year he reprised the role of Kurt in the Ant-Man sequel Ant-Man and the Wasp. In 2021 he appeared as Polka-Dot Man in The Suicide Squad, a character with  whom he said he connected on a personal level due to the childhood bullying he suffered as a result of his vitiligo. Later that same year he appeared in his third Denis Villeneuve film when he portrayed Piter De Vries in Dune.

Dastmalchian is a comic book writer. He debuted his horror comic series Count Crowley in 2019 published by Dark Horse Comics.

Personal life 
Dastmalchian married artist Evelyn "Eve" Leigh in 2014. They have two children. They live in Los Angeles.

Filmography

Film

Television

Music videos

Theatre

References

External links 

Living people
American male film actors
American male stage actors
American male television actors
American people of English descent
American people of French descent
American people of Iranian descent
American people of Irish descent
American people of Italian descent
American LGBT rights activists
Male actors from Kansas
People with vitiligo
DePaul University alumni
21st-century American male actors
1975 births
American comics writers